Mandar (also Andian, Manjar, Mandharsche) is an Austronesian language spoken by the Mandar ethnic group living in West Sulawesi province of Indonesia, especially in the coastal regencies of Majene and Polewali Mandar, as well as in a few settlements in the islands of Pangkep District (also known as the Spermonde Archipelago) and Ujung Lero, a small peninsula near Pare-Pare).

It is written in the Lontara script.

The ethnic Mandar people are closely related to three other groups living in South Sulawesi: Bugis, Makassar, and Toraja.

References

External links 
 Mandar alphabet and pronunciation at Omniglot
http://unicode-table.com/en/sections/buginese/

Languages of Indonesia
South Sulawesi languages